The canton of Albertville-2 is an administrative division of the Savoie department, southeastern France. It was created at the French canton reorganisation which came into effect in March 2015. Its seat is in Albertville.

It consists of the following communes:

Albertville (partly)
Bonvillard
Cléry
Frontenex
Gilly-sur-Isère
Grésy-sur-Isère
Grignon
Montailleur
Monthion
Notre-Dame-des-Millières
Plancherine
Sainte-Hélène-sur-Isère
Saint-Vital
Tournon
Verrens-Arvey

References

Cantons of Savoie